The Revue politique et littéraire, commonly known as the Revue bleue, was a French centre-left political magazine published from 1871 to 1939. It was founded by Eugène Yung (1827-1887). The in-house nickname "revue bleue" was a reference to La Revue scientifique from the same publishers, a scientific magazine which was established 8 years earlier, known from its pink cover as the "revue rose". The headquarters was in Paris. The magazine was published bi-monthly and then monthly.

Émile Faguet was literary critic for the Revue bleue from 1892. Joseph Reinach wrote articles on Balkan politics. Other contributors included René Doumic, Ferdinand Brunetière, Charles Maurras, Léon Cahun, Louis Léger, René Guénon, Robert de Bonnières (Mémoires d’aujourd’hui, 1880), and Paul Eugène Louis Deschanel (La question du Tonkin, 1883).

References

1871 establishments in France
1939 disestablishments in France
Defunct political magazines published in France
Bi-monthly magazines published in France
Monthly magazines published in France
French-language magazines
Magazines established in 1871
Magazines disestablished in 1939
Magazines published in Paris